Jorge Eduardo Sánchez Ramos (born 10 December 1997) is a Mexican professional footballer who plays as a right-back for Eredivisie club Ajax and the Mexico national team.

Club career

Santos Laguna
Born in Torreón, Sánchez began his career with Santos Laguna, joining the team's youth academy. He made his Liga MX debut on 18 September 2016 against Pumas UNAM in a 3–1 victory, playing all 90 minutes.

América
In June 2018, Sánchez joined Club América.

Ajax
On 10 August 2022, Sánchez joined Dutch club AFC Ajax on a four-year contract, joining up with international teammate Edson Álvarez. He was handed jersey number 19. On 28 August 2022, he made his Eredivisie debut for Ajax in a 2–0 victory against FC Utrecht. On 7 September 2022, Sánchez made his UEFA Champions League debut in a 4–0 home victory against Scottish club Rangers.

International career

Youth
Sánchez was included in the final roster that participated at the 2018 Toulon Tournament. He appeared in four matches and was included in the Best XI of the tournament as Mexico finished runner-up. That year, Sánchez also played in the Central American and Caribbean Games, appearing in two group stage matches. Mexico finished last in their group with one point.

Sánchez was in the preliminary roster for the 2020 CONCACAF Men's Olympic Qualifying Championship but did not make the final squad.

In 2021, Sánchez was included in the under-23 squad for Summer Olympics in Japan. He won the bronze medal with the Olympic team.

Senior
Sánchez made his senior national team debut on 26 March 2019 in a friendly against Paraguay, as a starter. In May, he was included in Gerardo Martino's preliminary list for the CONCACAF Gold Cup. On 9 June, during a friendly match against Ecuador, he picked up an injury on his right leg causing him to miss the Gold Cup.

In October 2022, Sánchez was named in Mexico's preliminary 31-man squad for the 2022 FIFA World Cup, and in November, he was ultimately included in the final 26-man roster.

Career statistics

Club

International

Scores and results list Mexico's goal tally first, score column indicates score after each Sánchez goal.

Honours
Santos Laguna
Liga MX: Clausura 2018

América
Liga MX: Apertura 2018
Copa MX: Clausura 2019
Campeón de Campeones: 2019

Mexico U23
Olympic Bronze Medal: 2020

Individual
CONCACAF Best XI: 2021
Toulon Tournament Best XI: 2018
Liga MX All-Star: 2021

References

External links
 
 Jorge Sanchez at Professial Debut Santos Laguna 
 
 

Living people
1997 births
Sportspeople from Torreón
Mexican footballers
Footballers from Coahuila
Association football defenders
Mexico international footballers
Mexico youth international footballers
Liga MX players
Liga Premier de México players
Santos Laguna footballers
Club América footballers
AFC Ajax players
Olympic footballers of Mexico
Footballers at the 2020 Summer Olympics
Olympic medalists in football
Olympic bronze medalists for Mexico
Medalists at the 2020 Summer Olympics
Mexican expatriate footballers
Mexican expatriate sportspeople in the Netherlands
Expatriate footballers in the Netherlands
2022 FIFA World Cup players